Great Hill is a  hill in Acton, Massachusetts, the site of a  wooded conservation area containing hiking trails, wetlands, and recreational facilities. It is the largest single parcel of conservation land in the town.

The hill has evidence of Native American use, including a stone mortar. There are also 18th-century farmers' stone walls criss-crossing the property, as well as picnic facilities near a small skating pond and athletic fields adjacent to the South Acton Fire Station. The hill abuts the Discovery Museum, which often uses Great Hill for educational programs.

References

External links
Official website

Acton, Massachusetts
Hills of Massachusetts
Landforms of Middlesex County, Massachusetts
Protected areas of Middlesex County, Massachusetts